Matthew Parry (born 14 January 1994) is a British racing driver.

Career

Karting
Born in Cardiff, Parry entered karting in 2006, when he finished second in the Hoddesdon Kart Club Championship Minimax. His biggest success was in the last year of his karting career, winning the Super 1 National Rotax Max Junior championship in 2010.

Formula Ford & InterSteps
In 2011 Parry made his début in single-seaters, taking part in the British Formula Ford Championship with Fluid Motorsport. He finished eighth with eighteen point-scoring finishes in 24 races.

For 2012, he decided to switch to the InterSteps championship for Fortec Motorsports. He took thirteen wins and a total of 21 podiums in 23 races on his way to the championship title.

Formula Renault
Parry continued his collaboration with Fortec for the 2013 Formula Renault 2.0 NEC season. He won five races during the season to take the championship title, taking four further podium finishes. His performances earned him a nomination for the McLaren Autosport BRDC Award for the first time. On 1 December 2013, after the evaluation tests held at Silverstone, Parry was named as the winner of the award, taking the £100,000 cash prize and a Formula One test with McLaren.

In 2014, Parry continued racing in Formula Renault, this time competing in Formula Renault Eurocup. He again raced with Fortec Motorsports, with whom he competed for in 2012 and 2013. He continued to race as part of the Caterham Racing Academy, of which he has been part since 2011.

GP3 Series
In 2015, Parry made his GP3 debut with Koiranen GP alongside Jimmy Eriksson and Adderly Fong.

In July 2016, Parry won his first race at the Hungaroring in Hungary after starting from second place on the grid. He had a good weekend overall, topping Friday practice and almost being on pole until he was pipped by Nyck de Vries. In the second race the following morning Parry crossed the line in P6, later to finish P5 as fellow GP3 driver Jack Aitken got a 5-second penalty for causing a collision with Parry's teammate Ralph Boschung.

Racing record

Career summary

† As Parry was a guest driver, he was ineligible for points.

Complete GP3 Series results
(key) (Races in bold indicate pole position) (Races in italics indicate fastest lap)

References

External links
 
 

1994 births
Living people
Sportspeople from Cardiff
Welsh racing drivers
Formula Ford drivers
Formula Renault 2.0 NEC drivers
Formula Renault Eurocup drivers
Formula Renault 2.0 Alps drivers
GP3 Series drivers
Blancpain Endurance Series drivers
Fluid Motorsport Development drivers
Fortec Motorsport drivers
Koiranen GP drivers
R-Motorsport drivers
Nismo drivers